Akhethetep (also Akhethotep or Akhty-hotep) was a high dignitary of ancient Egypt who lived during the Fifth Dynasty around 2400 BC. Akhethotep and his son Ptahhotep Tjefi were senior court officials during the rule of Djedkare (2414–2375 BC) and of Unas (Wenis), towards the end of the 5th Dynasty (2494–2345 BC). Akhethetep's titles included that of a vizier, making him to the highest official at the royal court, only second to the king. He was also overseer of the treasuries, overseer of the scribes of the king's documents and overseer of the granaries. Akhethetep was the son of Ptahhotep. His father was vizier too. 

He is famous for his tomb, discovered in Saqqara. The plan was recorded by Mariette  and it was published by N. de Garis Davies. It is a joined mastaba belonging to Ptahhotep Tjefi and Akhethetep.

References

Literature

Viziers of the Fifth Dynasty of Egypt
24th-century BC people
Overseer of the treasury